Praporshik Grigoriy Suk (also known as Grigory Suk in English) was a flying ace for the Imperial Russian Air Service during World War I.

Early life and service 
Born in  Lithuania on 12 December 1896, Grigoriy Suk was of Czech and Russian heritage. He was born on the Rassudovo Estate. His Russian mother, Ljubov Osipovna Sorokina, was the daughter of a well-known physician, as well as an alumnus of the Women's College of Mariinskoe. His Czech father, scientist Eduard Ivanovich Suk, was notable enough to be a hereditary honorary citizen of Moscow. His siblings were brothers Boris and Alexei. His uncle, Vyacheslav Suk, conducted the orchestra at the Bolshoi Theatre in Moscow. Grigoriy Suk was raised in the Russian Orthodox faith.

Young Suk was educated at the Moscow Classical School, and passed on to the Moscow Imperial Practical Academy to study architecture.

The outbreak of World War I changed Suk's direction, as he enlisted in the Cuirassiers on 5 August 1914. He subsequently requested a transfer to aviation service, and was forwarded to the Gatchina Flying School on 5 June 1915. In July 1915 he began his aviation training with a class on internal combustion engines.

World War I 
Grigoriy Suk made his first training flights in August 1915. After training, he qualified as a military pilot on 25 January 1916. On 27 January, Eduard Ivanovich Suk died abruptly; his son was granted a short leave to attend the funeral.

Suk was posted to the 26th Corps Aviation Detachment of the Imperial Russian Air Force on 11 March 1916 to fly Voisin Ls or Voisin LAs, although he did not arrive at the front until 28 March 1916. Despite being assigned to reconnaissance duties, he clashed with the enemy in the air. As his award commendation for the Cross of Saint George Third Class stated, he drove down an enemy aircraft with machine gun fire from 50 meters distance on 1 June 1916 for his first victory. His Fourth Class award of the Cross also mentioned combat with an Albatros. In fact, Suk won all four classes of the Cross while with the 26th Corps Aviation Detachment. He was also promoted to Mladshy-Unter-Officer (Senior Sergeant).

His diligence caused him to be sent for fighter training in Moscow on 4 July 1916. Upon graduation, he was posted to the Kingdom of Romania to join the 9th Fighter Aviation Detachment. He flew 19 combat sorties there during September and October 1916. He began reconnaissance patrols with Nieuport 10 serial number N714, and moved up to flying Nieuport 11 s/n N1109. On 27 October 1916, Imperial Order 1676 appointed Suk to the rank of Praporschik.

On 3 February 1917, Suk and Vladimir Strzhizhevsky staked a combat claim that went unconfirmed. On the 9th, a jamming gun aborted his attack on an enemy plane. On 12 February 1917, the engine of Suk's Nieuport failed at the end of a prolonged reconnaissance flight. His subsequent inept deadstick landing at Bakey Airfield overturned and damaged the machine. Suk was then assigned Morane-Saulnier I s/n MS742. As the weather cleared in the Spring of 1917, the tempo of combat accelerated. Suk scored his second victory on 26 March 1917; his third on 17 April 1917. He then entered a dry spell marked by unfruitful attacks that did blunt enemy reconnaissance efforts. He resumed his victories in early September, and he would string them out until 10 November.

On 28 November 1917, he was killed in a landing accident as he returned from a flight. As he turned to land, his machine spun in, and he died upon impact. Three days later, Suk's award of the Order of Saint George Fourth Class arrived.

List of aerial victories 
Although aviation historians cite Suk as credited with either eight or nine aerial victories, they posit slightly differing lists. The below is a compilation from available sources. Confirmed victories are numbered; unconfirmed victories are denoted "u/c".

See also Aerial victory standards of World War I, List of World War I flying aces from the Russian Empire

References 
 Allen Durkota. The Imperial Russian Air Service: Famous Pilots and Aircraft and World War I. Flying Machines Press, 1995. , 9780963711021.
 Norman Franks. Nieuport Aces of World War I. Osprey Publishing, 2000. , .
 Norman Franks; Russell Guest; Gregory Alegi. Above the War Fronts: The British Two-seater Bomber Pilot and Observer Aces, the British Two-seater Fighter Observer Aces, and the Belgian, Italian, Austro-Hungarian and Russian Fighter Aces, 1914–1918: Volume 4 of Fighting Airmen of WWI Series: Volume 4 of Air Aces of WWI. Grub Street, 1997. , .
 Victor Kulikov. Russian Aces of World War 1: Aircraft of the Aces. Osprey Publishing, 2013. , 9781780960616.

Endnotes 

1896 births
1917 deaths
Russian aviators
Imperial Russian Air Force personnel
Russian World War I flying aces
Russian military personnel of World War I
Recipients of the Cross of St. George
Recipients of the Order of the Crown (Romania)
Knights of the Order of the Crown (Romania)
Aviators killed in aviation accidents or incidents
Russian people of Czech descent
Military personnel from Moscow